Cereus ayisyen is a species of cactus from Haiti. It was originally named Cereus haitiensis, but that name is illegitimate as it had already been used for another species. The specific epithet ayisyen means "Haitian" in Haitian Creole.

References

ayisyen
Flora of Haiti
Flora without expected TNC conservation status